The Antwerp Diamond Bank (ADB) (Banque Diamantaire Anversoise and Antwerpse Diamantbank) was a small, 75-year-old bank that specialized exclusively in serving the diamond and the diamond jewelry sector. In addition to its headquarters in Antwerp, it had offices covering all the major traditional as well as emerging diamond centers such as Antwerp, Dubai, Geneva, Hong Kong, Mumbai and New York. ADB became currently a wholly owned subsidiary of KBC Bank, however, European Competition Commission directed KBC to divest the bank as part of the terms of the Belgian government's bail-out of KBC.

KBC agreed in December 2013 to sell ADB to the Chinese Yinren Group. However, the sale required regulatory approval and stalled; after the sale failed KBC stated in September 2014 that it would wind down ADB as no other entity had expressed an interest in buying ADB. ADB would make no new loans and would close out existing loans as they were paid off.

History

Origins
Société Belge de Banque established the Comptoir Diamantaire Anversois in 1934, in partnership with Banque Transatlantique, Société Internationale Forestière et Minière du Congo (Forminière ), and the De Beers Group. The company was the first financial institution to focus solely and entirely on the needs of the diamond industry; it opened its registered office in the very heart of Antwerp's diamond district.

In 1937, Belgium passed bank reform legislation that allowed the Comptoir Diamantaire Anversois to become a bank. At this point the Comptoir changed its name to Antwerp Diamond Bank. It also took the opportunity to double its equity base to BEF60 million (approximately 1.5 million euros), by bringing in Kredietbank and Compagnie Financière et Industrielle (Confindus)-Banque de Bruxelles as shareholders.

World War II
The diamond industry in Antwerp was heavily Jewish in its membership and so suffered inordinately during the Nazi occupation of Belgium during World War II. However, the Bank had been proactive. In 1940, before the German invasion, the then managing director and his staff moved their clients' diamond stock, consisting of both loan collateral and goods in custody, then valued at BEF 100 million (circa 2.5 million euros), and shipped them via France to England and ultimately into the United States. When the German occupation forces arrived they found the safes, safe deposit boxes, and accounts empty.

In 1941, Chemical Bank helped ADB establish a special agency in New York. After the liberation in 1944 ADB, whose headquarters had moved to Brussels during the war, returned to Antwerp and its clients.

1946-82: the good years ... and the crisis
After the war, ADB helped revive the Belgian diamond industry as the industry relocated from Amsterdam to Antwerp. Because of its ties to DeBeers, ADB was a major participant in the financing of rough diamonds at the sights (sales) that DeBeers conducted in London through the Central Selling Organization.

In 1949 ADB closed the agency in New York City that it had established in 1949.

That same year, Forminière sold its shares in ADB to Société Minière de Bécéka (Sibeka). Then in 1966 Transatlantique sold its shares in ADP, followed some twenty years later by Sibeka in 1985.

However, in the early 80's, both the bank and the entire diamond banking community worldwide faced serious problems when the international diamond market came under pressure both from developments inside the industry as well in the world economy in general. Still, the support of its shareholders and its customers enabled ADB to maintain its position during the crisis.

International expansion
In 1982, ADB established the Banque Diamantaire Anversoise (Suisse), a wholly owned subsidiary, in Geneva; the English name for the subsidiary was Antwerp Diamond Bank (Switzerland). This subsidiary focused on financing international diamond transactions and on portfolio management.

In 1999, KBC Bank acquired the shares in ADB that Generale Bank (which had merged with Société Belge de Banque in 1965), and Banque Bruxelles Lambert (the result of the 1975 merger of Banque de Bruxelles and Banque Lambert) had held. KBC thereby became the primary shareholder in ADB, increasing its ownership from 37% to 87%.

That same year ADB opened a representative office in New York under the name Antwerpse Diamantbank. The next year ADB opened a representative office in Hong Kong. The name of ADB's Swiss subsidiary became Diamond Bank (Switzerland). On 6 December 2001 the New York representative office changed its name to Antwerp Diamond Bank.

In 2002, KBC Bank increased its stake in ADB to 99.9%. To do so, KBC bought Henfin Holding, which had represented De Beers on the board of ADB as one of its founding shareholders.

That same year ADB opened a branch in Mumbai, the center for India's diamond industry. This branch has a staff of about 20 persons. (The industry in Mumbai started out with small diamonds, "cutting the uncuttable". It now has a share of the market for moderately big diamonds, once dominated by Tel Aviv, and is starting to encroach on cutting big diamonds, Antwerp's forte.)

In 2005, Diamond Bank (Switzerland) opened a representative office in Dubai, UAE.

In 2008, ADB established a subsidiary in Singapore: Antwerp Diamond Bank Asia Pacific. This was a regional headquarters that supports and develop activities in Mumbai, Hong Kong and possible future initiatives in China.

ADB was the first bank to create a commercial paper program for the diamond industry. The client was an Indian-owned company in Antwerp.

In 2008, Diamond Bank (Switzerland) ceased to operate as a subsidiary and instead became a representative office of ADP, which also took over the responsibility for the Dubai rep office.

In 2009, ADB signed a memorandum of understanding with the Bank of China.

Citations

References
Comer, Bruno and Chaim Even-Zohar (2009) Financing the World's Most Precious Treasures: Antwerp Diamond Bank, Commemorating its Diamond Jubilee 1934-2009. (Ramat Gan: Tracy Ltd., on behalf of Antwerp Diamond Bank). 

Diamond industry in Belgium
Companies based in Antwerp
Defunct banks of Belgium